Permanent Character Folder & Adventure Records is an accessory for the Dungeons & Dragons fantasy role-playing game.

Contents
Permanent Character Record is an accessory for players of the first edition AD&D rules, which consisted of a folder to contain various character statistics and information, and included record sheets to help the player track events that their player character was involved in.

Publication history
Permanent Character Record was designed by Harold Johnson, with a cover by Erol Otus, and was published by TSR in 1979 as a 32-page booklet with an outer folder.

Reception

Reviews

References

Dungeons & Dragons sourcebooks
Role-playing game supplements introduced in 1979